Ramayana is a retelling of the epic by C. Rajagopalachari. It was first published by Bharatiya Vidya Bhavan in 1957. This book is an abridged English retelling of the Valmiki Ramayana; he had earlier published a version of Kamba Ramayanam. Rajaji considered this book and his Mahabharata to be his greatest service to his countrymen.

As of 2001, the book had sold over a million copies.

References

External links
Book in pdf

1957 non-fiction books
Works based on the Ramayana
20th-century Indian books